Erlen railway station is a railway station in the municipality of Erlen, in the Swiss canton of Thurgau. It is an intermediate stop on the Winterthur–Romanshorn line and is served by local trains only.

Services 
Erlen is served by the S10 of the St. Gallen S-Bahn:

 : half-hourly service from Wil to Romanshorn.

References

External links 
 
 

Railway stations in the canton of Thurgau
Swiss Federal Railways stations